Rudolph's Shiny New Year is a 1976 American-Japanese Christmas and New Year's stop motion animated television special and a standalone sequel to the 1964 special Rudolph the Red-Nosed Reindeer produced by Rankin/Bass Productions. The special premiered on ABC on December 10, 1976.

Three years later, it was also aired on TV Asahi in Japan on December 24, 1979, under the Japanese dub title 赤鼻のトナカイ ルドルフ物語 (Akahananotonakai Rudorufu Monogatari).

Plot
Just after the events of Rudolph the Red-Nosed Reindeer, Santa Claus receives a letter from his friend Father Time asking for help to find Happy the Baby New Year before midnight ("the 12th bong") on New Year's Eve or else it will be December 31 forever. Santa sends Rudolph out to find him due to the snowstorm currently happening outside.

An evil giant vulture named Eon the Terrible is supposed to live for exactly one eon after which he will turn into ice and snow and disintegrate. As this particular eon will end January 1 of the New Year, he plans to kidnap Happy to keep the year from ending and stop time, thus preventing his predestined death.

General Ticker (a military clock) and the great Quarter-Past-Five, or Quart for short (a camel with a clock in his hump), bring Rudolph to Father Time's castle beyond the Sands of Time. Father Time speculates that Happy, who ran away due to his big ears being laughed at when they were first seen by Nanny Nine O'Clock, is hiding out in the "Archipelago of Last Years" where the Old Years retire and rule over an island styled to resemble the year over which they ruled. When Rudolph is attacked by Eon on the ocean while en route to the Archipelago, he is saved by Big Ben (a sperm whale with a clock attached to his tail) who transports Rudolph across the ocean.

Upon arrival in the Archipelago, Rudolph first travels to the island belonging to a caveman named O.M. (short for One Million B.C.). O.M. inhabits an island anachronistically inhabited with friendly dinosaurs and other prehistoric creatures. As Rudolph and his friends search for Happy (who left after his hat accidentally fell off saving a baby Pterodactyl and revealing his big ears, causing the dinosaurs to laugh), they repeatedly encounter Eon.

After other off-screen visits to the islands of 4000 B.C., 1492, 1893, and 1965 have been completed without success, Rudolph and O.M. head for the island of 1023 (pronounced "ten to three," as in the time 2:50), belonging to a Scottish knight with a long beard named Sir 1023 whose island is filled with medieval trappings along with several fairy tale and Mother Goose characters. Meanwhile, Happy manages to befriend the Three Bears, but becomes saddened when he removes his hat and exposes his big ears to them, causing him to leave again despite Baby Bear begging him not to go.

The group then travels to the island of 1776, which reflects Colonial America and is ruled over by "Sev" (AKA 1776) who resembles Benjamin Franklin. Following Happy's seeming rejection on the Island of 1776 following the daily parade, Eon kidnaps him and takes him to his lair on the Island of No-Name which is said to be located "due north of the North Pole".

The group now leaves the Archipelego in pursuit. Catching up to Eon, they attempt to rescue Happy. However, Eon (upon being awakened by the sound of O.M. tumbling) thwarts them by sending an avalanche down on the group and trapping them inside giant snowballs. Managing to melt his way free using his nose, Rudolph climbs up to Eon's nest where he finds Happy, who refuses to leave. Rudolph shows Happy his nose and tells him his own story of being bullied because of his nonconformity before asking Happy to let him see his ears. Happy does so, and Rudolph, like everyone else before him, laughs at the sight. Happy once again gets upset, but Rudolph explains that the sight of Happy's ears had made him feel so wonderful that he had to laugh out loud, just like it had done with everyone else. With this declaration, Happy shouts out with joy, but causes Eon to awaken. Rudolph quickly tells Happy to take off his hat and leave it off for good. At the sight of Happy's large ears, Eon bursts into uncontrollable laughter which sends him tumbling down the side of the mountain and into the three remaining snowballs, freeing O.M., 1023, and Sev. Rudolph realizes that Eon is now so full of warmth and happiness that it would be impossible for him to turn to ice and snow.

Santa arrives and the gang returns to Father Time's castle with Happy just before the 12th bong, which is designated "19-Wonderful".

Archipelago of Last Years

When the old year has been retired, they settle on an island in the Archipelago of Last Years where time remains still on that island. Among the islands of the Archipelago of Last Years are:

 1,000,000 BC Island: Represented as a prehistoric, anachronistic island that consists of dinosaurs, other prehistoric creatures, and cavepeople living together. O.M. lives here.
 4,000 BC Island: Rudolph mentions that all its inhabitants wanted to do was build pyramids.
 1023 Island: Represented as a medieval island filled with fairy tale characters. The year 1023 is said in Father Time's narration to be when all the well-known fairy tales and nursery rhymes actually happened. Sir 1023 lives here.
 1492 Island: Rudolph mentions that the people on that island were too busy discovering things to talk to Rudolph and O.M.
 1776 Island: Represented as a Colonial American island that celebrates American Independence Day on a daily basis. 1776 (Sev) lives here.
 1893 Island: Rudolph mentions that the inhabitants have never heard of Happy. 1893 was indeed an unhappy time as a major economic depression called the Panic of 1893 hit the United States that year.
 1965 Island: Rudolph stated that island was "too noisy" to search for Happy. Among the noisy world events of 1965 included Beatlemania (and other British Invasion-related hysteria) and growing opposition to United States involvement in the Vietnam War.

Cast
 Red Skelton as Father Time (Narrator), Baby Bear
 Billie Richards as Rudolph
 Morey Amsterdam as One Million BC
 Frank Gorshin as Sir 1023
 Paul Frees as 1776, Santa Claus, General Ticker, Eon the Terrible, Humpty Dumpty and Quarter Past Five
 Don Messick as Papa Bear, Rumpelstiltskin, Prince Charming, Seven Dwarfs
 Harold Peary as Big Ben the Whale
 Iris Rainer as Mama Bear, Nanny Nine O'Clock, Happy the Baby New Year

Crew
 Producers/Directors: Jules Bass, Arthur Rankin, Jr.
 Writer: Romeo Muller
 Music/Lyrics: Johnny Marks
 Design: Paul Coker, Jr.
 Sound Recording: William Bell, John Curcio, Don Hahn
 Sound Effects: Tom Clack
 "Animagic" Production Supervisors: Ichiro Komuro, Akikazu Kono
 Post Production Supervisor: Irwin Goldress
 Music Arranger/Conductor: Maury Laws

Songs
 The Moving Finger Writes
 Turn Back The Years
 It's Raining Sunshine
 What A Wonderful World We Live In
 Fourth Of July Parade
 Have A Little Faith In Me
 Rudolph the Red-Nosed Reindeer
 Have a Happy New Year

Production
The special was filmed in 1975 (according to the copyright), but it was shown on ABC on December 10, 1976.

For the special, Rudolph was given a redesign by Paul Coker, Jr.

Television rights

The rights to this special are held by Warner Bros. Domestic Television Distribution, which used to license the show to The Walt Disney Company; Disney carried the special Freeform annually on its 25 Days of Christmas marathon (and occasionally aired it over-the-air on ABC). Since 2018, Warner Bros. has licensed the special to AMC and its sister channels for the Best Christmas Ever block.

Home media release
Rudolph's Shiny New Year was first released on VHS by Warner Home Video in 1992. It was also re-released on VHS in 1999, and for the first time on DVD alongside The Year Without a Santa Claus, on October 31, 2000. The special, along with other Rankin/Bass Christmas specials and Chuck Jones's animated TV adaptation of Dr. Seuss' How the Grinch Stole Christmas!, was bundled in Warner's Christmas Television Favorites DVD box set, released on October 2, 2007. On October 7, 2008, these same titles were released in another holiday-themed DVD set, Classic Christmas Favorites. Warner Home Video released seven different original Rankin/Bass holiday classics along with Dr. Seuss' How the Grinch Stole Christmas! on the third DVD box set, Santa's Magical Stories, released on October 4, 2011. A Miser Brothers' Christmas, a sequel to the 1974 special, The Year Without a Santa Claus, is also included.

DVD details
Released with The Year Without a Santa Claus
 Release date: October 31, 2000
 Full Screen
 Region: 1
 Aspect Ratio: 1.33:1
 Audio tracks: English
 Second extra: Nestor, The Long-Eared Christmas Donkey

See also
List of Rankin/Bass Productions films

References

External links

 
 ABC Feature Page for Rudolph's Shiny New Year
 Archived ABC Feature Page for Rudolph's Shiny New Year

1976 animated films
1976 films
1976 in American television
1976 television specials
1970s American animated films
1970s American television specials
1970s animated short films
American Broadcasting Company television specials
American musical fantasy films
1970s animated television specials
Christmas television specials
Films scored by Johnny Marks
Films scored by Maury Laws
Television shows directed by Jules Bass
Television shows directed by Arthur Rankin Jr.
Films set in the Arctic
Films set on islands
Musical television specials
New Year's television specials
Rankin/Bass Productions television specials
Stop-motion animated television shows
Rudolph the Red-Nosed Reindeer
Santa Claus in film
Santa Claus in television
Stop-motion animated short films
Animated films about time travel
Time travel in television
Television shows written by Romeo Muller
American Christmas television specials
Fiction set in prehistory
Fiction set in the 4th millennium BC
Works set in the 11th century
Works set in the 15th century
Fiction set in 1776
Works set in the 1770s
Fiction set in 1893
Fiction set in 1965
Animated Christmas television specials